Geolyces is a genus of moths in the family Geometridae described by Warren in 1894. This name is a replacement name for Lyces Walker, 1860.

References

Ennominae
Geometridae genera